Paracamelus is an extinct genus of camel in the family Camelidae. It originated in North America during the Middle Miocene but crossed the Beringian land bridge into Eurasia during the Late Miocene, approximately 7.5–6.5  million years ago (Ma). It is ancestral to living camels of the genus Camelus. A population remained in northern North America, which became the high Arctic camel, which survived until the Middle Pleistocene approximately 1 Ma.

Taxonomy
Paracamelus was named by Schlosser (1903). Its type is Paracamelus gigas. It was assigned to Camelidae by Carroll (1988).

Fossil distribution
The earliest fossil of Paracamelus is from the Middle Miocene Esmeralda Formation in Nye County Nevada and is between 10 and 12.5 million years old. During the late Miocene the genus spread to Eurasia across the Bering land bridge, arriving in Spain and Italy just prior to the Messinian Salinity Crisis at approximately 6 Ma, before spreading to Africa around the Miocene-Pliocene boundary, around 5.3 million years ago.

Later range spanned from Spain and Italy to Chad and Shanxi Province, China.

References

Further reading
 
 

Prehistoric camelids
Pliocene even-toed ungulates
Pleistocene even-toed ungulates
Pleistocene genus extinctions
Cenozoic mammals of Europe
Cenozoic mammals of Asia
Cenozoic mammals of Africa
Prehistoric even-toed ungulate genera
Pliocene first appearances